Swish Beverages (stylized as SWISH) is an American wine brand produced in California. It was launched with the release of White Girl Rosé in 2015.

History

Founding
Swish Beverages was formed by social media personality Josh Ostrovsky (aka "The Fat Jewish"), David Oliver Cohen, Tanner Cohen (the brothers behind the White Girl Problems book series), and Alexander Ferzan. In June 2015, they launched White Girl Rosé, a blend of Sauvignon Blanc and White Zinfandel. As of 2019, Swish products are available for sale in 27 U.S. states.

Babe
In June 12, 2016, Swish released Babe Rosé, a canned sparkling rosé. In 2018, Babe Grigio with Bubbles, and Babe Red with Bubbles were released. In April 2019, Babe named Emily Ratajkowski its Chief Taste Officer and launched a national ad campaign featuring her. Diplo is an investor in the brand.

Anheuser-Busch InBev acquisition
In June 2019, it was announced that Anheuser-Busch InBev had acquired Swish Beverages (after first acquiring a minority stake in 2018), marking the brewer's largest wine investment to date.

Product list

References

External links
 Official website

Wine brands
Rosé wines
California wine
Alcoholic drink brands
2015 establishments in California
AB InBev